Adesmus chalumeaui is a species of beetle in the family Cerambycidae. It was described by Touroult in 2004. It is known from Martinique.

References

Adesmus
Beetles described in 2004